Líbero Parri Romero (born 18 January 1982) is a Spanish retired footballer who played as an attacking midfielder.

In a senior career spanning 12 years, he appeared in 212 Segunda División games and scored 34 goals while representing seven clubs, mainly Albacete (four seasons in that tier, five in total).

In La Liga he played 57 matches, with Albacete, Valencia and Racing de Santander.

Club career
Parri was born in Burjassot, Valencian Community. A gifted attacking player who emerged from local Valencia CF's youth system, he never established himself with the first team. During 2000–01 he made his first two and only La Liga appearances with them, against CA Osasuna and Racing de Santander, and finished the season with neighbouring Elche CF.

Until his release on 1 July 2005, Parri was consecutively loaned to CD Numancia, Albacete Balompié and Racing Santander, competing with the last two sides in the top flight – he was subsequently purchased by the second club. From 2007 to 2009 another two campaigns in Segunda División ensued, at Cádiz CF and Levante UD, the latter also in his native region (loaned by Cádiz).

In August 2009, Parri broke ties with Cádiz but stayed in the second level, quickly signing a one-year contract with Gimnàstic de Tarragona. In late June 2010, he was released after one unassuming season – 14 matches out of a possible 42, 272 minutes of play.

After retiring at the age of only 28, Parri worked as a players' agent.

Honours
Spain U16
UEFA European Under-16 Championship: 1999

References

External links

CiberChe biography and stats 
Queso Mecánico biography and stats 

1982 births
Living people
Sportspeople from the Province of Valencia
People from Burjassot
Spanish footballers
Footballers from the Valencian Community
Association football midfielders
La Liga players
Segunda División players
Segunda División B players
Valencia CF Mestalla footballers
Valencia CF players
Villarreal CF players
Elche CF players
CD Numancia players
Albacete Balompié players
Racing de Santander players
Cádiz CF players
Levante UD footballers
Gimnàstic de Tarragona footballers
Spain youth international footballers
Spain under-21 international footballers